A Dictionarie French and English: published for the benefite of the studious in that language, is an English–French dictionary published in 1593 in London at Thomas Woodcock by the Huguenot refugee in England, Claude de Sainliens.

Reprinted by Scolar Press in 1974, the Dictionarie French and English was, along the Dictionnaire françois-latin, contenant les mots et les manières de parler françois, tournez en latin by Robert Estienne, one of the sources of the Dictionarie of the French and English Tongues (1611) by Cotgrave often wrongly considered, as the first French–English dictionary. A 1608 privilege presents Cotgrave's Dictionarie as collected first by C. Holyband and augmented or altered by R. Cotgrave.

Sources 
 Lucy E. Farrer, Un devancier de Cotgrave : la vie et les œuvres de Claude de Sainliens alias Claudius Holyband, Paris, H. Champion, 1908 ; réimp. Genève, Slatkine Reprints, 1971
 Vera Ethel Smalley, The Sources of A dictionarie of the French and English tongues by Randle Cotgrave (London, 1611); a study in Renaissance lexicography, Baltimore, Johns Hopkins Press, 1948, (p. 71–88)

Lexicography
English bilingual dictionaries
Dictionary
1593 books